Blaue Lacke (German for "the Blue Puddle") is a lake in the Stubai Alps in Tyrol, Austria.

Lakes of Tyrol (state)
LBlaueLacke